Andrew or Andy Porter may refer to:

Academics
 Andrew C. Porter (born 1942), American educational psychologist and psychometrician
 Andrew Porter (historian) (born 1945), British historian
 Andrew Porter (music critic) (1928–2015), British music critic and scholar

Military
 Andrew Porter (Civil War general) (1820–1872), American Civil War general
 Andrew Porter (Revolutionary War officer) (1743–1813), American Revolutionary War officer

Sports
 Marshall Porter (1874–1900), Irish sportsman, son of Sir Andrew Porter
 Andrew Porter (baseball) (1910–2010), Negro league baseball player
 Andy Porter (footballer, born 1937), Scottish footballer
 Andy Porter (footballer, born 1968), English footballer and coach
 Andrew Porter (rugby union) (born 1996), Irish rugby player

Other people
 Andrew I. Porter (born 1946), American science fiction editor and publisher
 Andrew J. Porter (born 1972), American short story writer and novelist
 Sir Andrew Porter, 1st Baronet (1837–1919), Irish lawyer, judge, and MP

See also
 Sir Andrew Horsbrugh-Porter, 3rd Baronet (1907–1986), British nobleman